Exonuclease NEF-sp, also known as LOC81691, is a human gene.

References

Further reading